The 2022 Austin Peay Governors football team represented Austin Peay State University during the 2022 NCAA Division I FCS football season as a member of the ASUN Conference (ASUN), coinciding with the conference's addition of football for that season. They were led by third-year head coach Scotty Walden and played their games at Fortera Stadium in Clarksville, Tennessee.

Previous season

The Governors finished the 2021 season 6–5 overall, and 4–2 in Ohio Valley Conference (OVC) play. The 2021 season was their last season in the OVC.

Schedule

Game summaries

at Western Kentucky

Presbyterian

Mississippi Valley State

at Alabama A&M

No. 16 Eastern Kentucky

at Central Arkansas

Murray State

Jacksonville State

at North Alabama

at Kennesaw State

at No. 8 (FBS) Alabama

Sources:

Coaching staff
 Head Coach - Scotty Walden
 Assistant head coach/defensive coordinator/safeties coach - Chris Kappas
 Co-defensive coordinator/defensive backs coach - Akeem Davis
 Defensive Run-Game Coordinator/defensive line coach - Chris Jones
 Co-offensive coordinator/offensive line coach - Ryan Stanchek
 Pass-Game Coordinator/wide receivers coach - Lanear Sampson
 Co-Special teams coordinator/Gov Backs coach - Joe Pappalardo
 Co-Special teams coordinator/linebacker Coach - J.J. Clark
 Running backs coach - Jourdan McNeill
 Tight ends coach - Ryan Yurachek

References

Austin Peay
Austin Peay Governors football seasons
Austin Peay Governors football